Acacia obtusifolia, commonly known as stiff-leaf wattle or blunt-leaf wattle, is a perennial tree in subfamily Mimosoideae of family Fabaceae.

Description
Acacia obtusifolia is an upright or spreading perennial tree which grows from 1.5m to 8m in height and it is native to Australia.  It is closely related to Acacia longifolia.  Acacia obtusifolia can be distinguished by it having phyllode margins which are resinous, it usually blooms later in the year and it has paler flowers than Acacia longifolia. It flowers usually from December through February.  Some populations of Acacia obtusifolia can survive winters to −6 °C and possibly a light snow, however plants from populations in areas that are frost free such as the coastal ranges of Northern NSW are susceptible to cold and will be killed by frosts lower than −3 °C. These populations avoid the valley floors and occur mainly on sandstone ridges well above the frost line.

Phytochemicals
Teracacidin, a flavan-3,4-diol, can be isolated from A. obtusifolia heartwood.

No formal scientific publishing of phytochemistry, several chromatographs show 0.3% alkaloid consisting 2:1 N-Methyltryptamine, dimethyltryptamine, plus trace betacarbolines; another found additional 5-methoxydimethyltryptamine and gramine. Is highly variable in composition, sometimes devoid of tryptamines [Ref: Nen, EntheogenReview (journal) 1996 ed. J. de Korne; privately commissioned test at Southern Cross University, NSW, Australia, 2000]. Also findings of 5-MeO-DMT, DMT and bufotenine. Some internet sources claim a 0.45% average dimethyltryptamine in the bark and 0.3% in the dried young leaves. Similarly, Mulga states figures ranging from 0.4% to 0.5% in the dried material, noting there to be some variability.

References

External links

 Acacia (Ayahuasca: alkaloids, plants & analogs)

obtusifolia
Pantropical flora
Fabales of Australia
Trees of Australia
Flora of New South Wales
Flora of Victoria (Australia)